Folke Brundin (born 12 April 1963) is a Swedish rower. He competed in the men's coxless four event at the 1988 Summer Olympics.

References

External links
 

1963 births
Living people
Swedish male rowers
Olympic rowers of Sweden
Rowers at the 1988 Summer Olympics
Sportspeople from Västra Götaland County